Alvaro VIII (Mvemba a Mpanzu), of the House of Kinlaza, was king of the Kingdom of Congo, from 1666 to 1669.

He was elevated to the throne by Paulo da Silva, Count of Soyo, who marched on São Salvador and killed his predecessor, King Alvaro VII.

In 1667, he sent his ambassador, Anastasius, to Luanda (Angola), to negotiate a treaty that ceded to the Portugueses the right to exploit the mines of Congo, located in the provinces of Mbamba and Mpemba. Theodosius, Duke of Mbamba, bowed to the king's decision, but Peter, Marquis of Mbemba, refused.

Leading a small army, Peter attacked Mbamba, killed Theodosius and then invaded the kingdom's capital, São Salvador, killing Alvaro VIII and proclaimed himself king under the name of Peter III.

See also
List of Manikongo of Kongo
Kingdom of Kongo
House of Kinlaza

References
 Lewis, Thomas - The Old Kingdom of Kongo, in The Geographical Journal, Vol. 31, No. 6 (Jun., 1908).

Manikongo of Kongo
17th-century African people
1669 deaths